The European Quidditch Cup, also known as EQC and formerly as the European Quidditch Championship, is the culminating championship tournament for the sport of quidditch in Europe. It began to be legitimised in 2014 when the International Quidditch Association became an international federation for quidditch. The first tournament took place in 2012 in France as quidditch began to develop across Europe. Today, the tournament is the highest level of championship in Europe besides the European Games with league-level tournaments being the qualifying competitions. In 2019, Division 1 of EQC was held in Harelbeke, Belgium, where the Paris Titans won the championship for the fourth time in their history.

History
Originally held in Lesparre-Médoc, France, EQC has since grown into the largest quidditch tournament in Europe. EQC 2014 saw teams from almost more countries than the 2014 Global Games, and EQC 2015 received teams from at least twelve different quidditch-playing nations.

Qualification
EQC 2015 saw a different form of qualification than its predecessors that introduced a team limit to the tournament as well as qualification guidelines. The Quidditch Europe committee has planned to change the qualification format for EQC 2016 and onward. Currently, the committee for EQC is distributing bids to individual nations based on discussions with NGBs' representatives and team pre-registration. It is for each national governing body of quidditch to determine how individual bids will be partitioned to teams under their jurisdiction.

Going forward starting with the 2018–19 season, the European Quidditch Cup is held in two divisions, Division 1 and Division 2, in order to facilitate both highly competitive gameplay at the top end and the ever-growing player base in Europe overall.

Hosts 

EQC 2018 was held in Pfaffenhofen an der Ilm, Germany.

2017's edition of the tournament was held in the Belgian city of Mechelen after Gallipoli 2016.

EQC 2015 was being hosted by Oxford University's quidditch club and QuidditchUK. EQC 2014 was hosted by the then-Belgium Muggle Quidditch (current: Belgian Quidditch Federation) and the Brussels Qwaffles. The first EQC was hosted by the then-French Quidditch Association (current: Fédération du quidditch français).

Selection procedures
Interested teams or NGBs submit a bid proposal outlining their location, the cost and the benefits attached to their bid to a sub-committee composed of Quidditch Europe members. The sub-committee then chooses the bid and selects from an applicant pool the tournament director.

Past champions of Division 1

Past champions of Division 2

See also

 International Quidditch Association
 Muggle quidditch
 British Quidditch Cup

References

External links
IQA website

Quidditch competitions
Recurring sporting events established in 2012
2012 establishments in Europe